Washington County Courthouse is a historic courthouse located at Potosi, Washington County, Missouri.  It was built in 1908, and is a two-story, Renaissance Revival style brick building with a hipped roof.  It features a projecting three-story entrance tower topped by a belfry.

It was listed on the National Register of Historic Places in 2011.

References

County courthouses in Missouri
Courthouses on the National Register of Historic Places in Missouri
Renaissance Revival architecture in Missouri
Government buildings completed in 1908
Buildings and structures in Washington County, Missouri
National Register of Historic Places in Washington County, Missouri